The Dune Encyclopedia is a 1984 collection of essays written by Willis E. McNelly and multiple other contributors as a companion to Frank Herbert's Dune series of science fiction novels.

Overview
The Dune Encyclopedia, written by McNelly and 42 other contributors as a companion to the Dune series, was published in paperback in 1984. It describes in great detail many aspects of the Dune universe not covered in the novels themselves, such as character biographies and explanations of key elements, including planets, factions like the Bene Gesserit and Mentats, the spice melange, and technology such as heighliners and stillsuits.

Publication
The Dune Encyclopedia was published by Berkley Books, an imprint of Putnam, the publisher of all of Frank Herbert's Dune novels. The cover called the work "complete" and "authorized". Additionally, Frank Herbert approved the book, considering it "amusing" and "fascinating". The Encyclopedia was compiled and published between God Emperor of Dune (1981) and Heretics of Dune (1984), and Herbert "read large portions of God Emperor of Dune, then in the final stages, to McNelly during the compiling of the volume so that McNelly could keep abreast of developments." Herbert himself wrote the foreword for the Encyclopedia (dated November 1983), which noted:

The Dune Encyclopedia is written as an encyclopedia published within the Dune universe itself, edited by "Hadi Benotto", a fictional archaeologist mentioned by Frank Herbert in his novels God Emperor of Dune and Heretics of Dune. Rather than claiming to contain absolute fact about this universe, the introduction by Benotto notes that "readers of The Dune Encyclopedia should understand its limitations: it is not designed as a definitive study of the entire eras encompassed by the Atreides Imperium" and that a portion of the (fictional) source material is shaped by the interests and influences of the God Emperor Leto II.

In 1999, McNelly stated that he had proposed to Frank Herbert that they collaborate on a Dune prequel novel, expanding upon the Butlerian Jihad story presented in The Dune Encyclopedia. He noted, "FH and I had discussed writing it together and he agreed with my general plot outline, completed first chapter, and so on but his untimely death prevented us from continuing."

Reception
Dave Langford reviewed The Dune Encyclopaedia for White Dwarf #61, and stated that "The production is quite impressive, though real or faked photos instead of line-drawings would have added greatly to the "encyclopaedia" look. Whether it's of interest to mere readers is debatable, but garners will be fascinated."

Colin Greenland reviewed The Dune Encyclopedia for Imagine magazine, and stated, "Unlike existing reader's guides to the worlds of Tolkien and others, The Dune Encyclopedia is itself a work of fiction, rich in imaginary footnotes and learned sources, and 'newly discovered information'. Herbert himself is (of course) delighted, but promises 'Issues still to be explored as the Chronicles unfold'. Where will it end?"

Reviews
Review by Arthur O. Lewis (1984) in Fantasy Review, September 1984
Review by Don D'Ammassa (1984) in Science Fiction Chronicle, #61 October 1984
Review by Alma Jo Williams (1984) in Science Fiction Review, Winter 1984
Review by Thomas A. Easton [as by Tom Easton] (1984) in Analog Science Fiction/Science Fact, November 1984
Review by Algis Budrys (1984) in The Magazine of Fantasy & Science Fiction, November 1984
Review by Gene DeWeese (1984) in Science Fiction Review, Winter 1984
Review by Patricia Matthews (1984) in Thrust, #21, Fall 1984/Winter 1985
Review by Robert Coulson (1985) in Amazing Science Fiction, January 1985
Review by Joseph Nicholas (1985) in Paperback Inferno, #52

Relationship with subsequent novels

Some ideas in The Dune Encyclopedia were contradicted in the later Dune prequel series of novels (1999–present) written after Frank Herbert's death by his son Brian Herbert and Kevin J. Anderson, as well as their sequel novels Hunters of Dune (2006) and Sandworms of Dune (2007), which complete the original series. Brian Herbert and Anderson have stated repeatedly that in writing the sequel and prequel novels, they used Frank Herbert's own notes found after his death.

In response to questions over why the new post-Frank Herbert Dune novels conflict with The Dune Encyclopedia, the book was declared non-canon on the official Dune website in a letter credited to McNelly, Brian Herbert, and Anderson:

References

1984 books
20th-century encyclopedias
Berkley Books books
Encyclopedia
Encyclopedias of fictional worlds